First Baptist Church was a historic African-American Baptist church located in the Gainsboro neighborhood of Roanoke, Virginia.  It was built in 1898–1900, and was a large six-bay nave-plan brick church with Romanesque and Gothic detailing.  It featured a clipped gable roof and a front bell tower. A one-story Parish Hall was built in 1936. First Baptist Church occupied the building until moving to a new sanctuary in 1982.  The church was destroyed by fire in April 1995.

The controversial Reverend Richard R. Jones was the first minister of the church, and guided it through the early stages of planning and construction between 1882 and 1904.

It was listed on the National Register of Historic Places in 1990 and delisted in 2001.

References

External links
First Baptist Church Gainsboro website

African-American history of Virginia
Former National Register of Historic Places in Virginia
Churches on the National Register of Historic Places in Virginia
Churches completed in 1900
20th-century Baptist churches in the United States
Baptist churches in Virginia
Churches in Roanoke, Virginia
National Register of Historic Places in Roanoke, Virginia